Kettlebell Sport lifting (girevoy sport, GS) a.k.a. Girya is a repetitive weight lifting sport performed with kettlebells in a given period of time.

Competitive kettlebell lifting has a long history in Russia and Eastern Europe, but developed as an organised, standard sport under the name kettlebell lifting during the 1960s.

Lifts
The sport consists of three main lifts: the snatch, jerk and the long cycle. Jerk and Long Cycle can be performed with one bell or two kettlebells of equal weight.

Snatch: A single kettlebell is swung using one hand from between the knees to above the head in a single motion.
Jerk: Two kettlebells are grasped in each hand and swung to the 'rack position' at chest level, then jerked above the head. It can be performed with one kettlebell.
Long Cycle: Two kettlebells are cleaned from knee level to chest level, then jerked to above the head. It can be performed with one kettlebell.

Rules

Classic competition format is usually composed of two to three categories; biathlon, long cycle and snatch. The lifter is given ten minutes for each event to perform as many repetitions as possible. They include:

 Biathlon involves the girevik (kettlebell lifter) performing a set of jerks for ten minutes, with at least 1 hour rest, followed by a set of snatches for ten minutes. Bells cannot be set down or the set is over. When using one bell, only one arm switch is allowed. Jerk reps receive one point. Snatch reps receive 0.5 points. Biathlon score is the combined jerk and snatch points.
 Long cycle involves the girevik performing a set of clean and jerks for ten minutes. Bells cannot be set down or the set is over. When using one bell, only one arm switch is allowed. Each rep is 1 point.
Snatch is a ten minute set with only one arm switch allowed. Bell cannot be set down or the set is over. When using one bell, only one arm switch is allowed. Each rep is 1 point.

Competition kettlebell colours are 8 kg (Pink), 12 kg (Blue), 16 kg (Yellow), 20 kg (Purple), 24 kg (Green), 28 kg (Orange), 32 kg (Red).
Traditional competitions require the male lifter to use 1-pood (16 kg), 1.5-pood (24 kg), and 2-pood (32 kg) competition kettlebells of similar size with identifying colours. Some competitive federations allow 8 kg, 12 kg, 16 kg, 20 kg & 24 kg for women and 16 kg, 20 kg, 24 kg, 28 kg, 32 kg, 40 kg for men.

Terminology
KB – often used abbreviation for kettlebell.
Pendulum – path the kettlebell takes as it moves from between the legs to either the rack or overhead position in Snatch.
Swing—kettlebell movement that involves moving the bell in a pendulum motion from between the legs to the overhead position. Basic and start-up kettlebell exercise. Can be performed with one or two hands. There are two variations: Russian swing and American swing.
Backswing – the portion of the swing or snatch in which the bell is moving backward between the legs.
Upswing – the portion of the swing or snatch in which the bell is moving forward and up towards the top of the swing or overhead position.
Rack position – the V-position of the shoulder, elbow, and wrist on the torso where the kettlebell rests between repetitions of jerk or long cycle. Ideally the elbow rests on the top portion of the hip joint.
Lockout – when the arm is fully extended in the overhead position---wrist over shoulder, and the knees are straight as if you are standing in an upside down handstand.
Joint stacking – Ensuring proper alignment of joints in overhead lockout position, meaning a straight line can be drawn from wrist to elbow to shoulder to hip to knees to ankles.
Fixation – when the lifter and kettlebell completely stop all movement at the completion of a repetition, the component of a lift that determines whether the repetition will be counted towards the competition score; also a chance to rest.
Clean – kettlebell movement that involves moving the bell using the hips in a pendulum motion from between the legs to chest level in front of the body in the Rack position or the top of the swing position.
Hang clean –
Jerk – kettlebell movement that uses the triple extension (see definition below) to launch the kettlebell from the rack position to overhead position. Jerk begins with a dynamic push-press (see definition below) with the heels lifting, followed by a squat under the overhead lockout and finishing with standing up with straight legs. 
OAJ – one arm jerk—using one kettlebell.
Double Jerk, Jerk or TAJ (two arm jerk) – uses 2 kettlebells.
Triple extension – Full extension of the hips, knees, and ankles that provides the power to launch the kettlebell overhead in the jerk movement.
Long Cycle (also called long jerk or (kettlebell) clean and jerk) – kettlebell movement that is composed of the clean, followed by the jerk, then a drop to the rack and the re-cleaned for the next jerk.
TALC – two arm long cycle, meaning long cycle with two kettlebells 
OALC – one arm long cycle, meaning long cycle with one kettlebell 
Snatch – kettlebell movement that uses the legs and hips to move the kettlebell from the swing into the overhead position.
Half snatch – kettlebell movement in which dropping into rack is substituted for the snatch drop.
Black snatch – a method of training grip and endurance for snatch in which one or multiple swings are added before each snatch. Repeat for desired amount of time (or until you drop the bell).
Olympic snatch – A style of snatch in which the backswing is eliminated and the bell moves in a straighter path up and down, often employed once the lifter's forearms have fatigued at the end of a set.
Hang snatch.
Switch – when the lifter changes the arm used with the kettlebell. – one switch rule (classic International Union of Kettlebell Lifting competition) or unlimited/multiple switches rule (marathon International Kettlebell Marathon Federation competition).
Speed switch.
Single/one hand switch.
Two-hand switch – not allowed.
Static/dead hang – when the lifter is just holding the Kbell without moving — not allowed in competitions.
Rebounding – not allowed.
Push press – kettlebell movement that utilizes strength from legs to get the bell to the overhead position. 
Clean and push Press – kettlebell movement that is composed of the clean, followed by the push press.
Press / military press – kettlebell movement that relies on the strength of the arm alone to get to the overhead position.
Clean and press – kettlebell movement that is composed of the clean, followed by the press.
Kettlebell high pulls / kettlebell standing pull-up – kettlebell movement; kettlebell is between the feet then grabbed with both arms maintaining flat back then ascended and raised to waist followed by pulling it directly in front of the face (elbows stay high and reach eye height (handle is at chin level)).
Windmill – kettlebell movement; stance is wider than shoulder width. Kettlebell is held above head with straight arms. If KB is held in the right hand, the body is inclining to left side in an attempt to touch floor with left hand and vice versa.
Set – length of time a kettlebell lift is performed for.
RPM – repetitions per minute, which is used to pace a kettlebell set.
Kettlebell coefficient – allows comparing results achieved using kettlebells of different weights in the same weight class and in the same discipline (each KB weight has an assigned coefficient). Score is then calculated as number of repetitions x KB coefficient. Used in Ultimate Girevik Cup.
(kettlebell) grips – regular grip, reverse grip, pinch grip, finger grip, ball grip.
(kettlebell) holds – 1 KB/2 hands, 1 KB/1 hand, 2 KB/1 hand (holds both kettlebells), 2 KB/2 hands (each holds a kettlebell), 2 KB Squared (2 hands hold 2 kettlebells in each hand).
one hand holds - one hand hold, horn, bottom up.
two hand holds - two hand hold, horn squeeze, horn taffy pull, two hand bottom up, waiter, crusher, foot in handle, farmer hold.
kettle clamp – gear that enables transformation of ordinary dumbbell into a kettlebell.

Organizations
There are two main international sanctioning bodies: the International Union of Kettlebell Lifting (IUKL) based in Riga, Latvia and the World Kettlebell Sport Federation (WKSF) based in Geneva, Switzerland which formed in 2018. The All-Russia Kettlebell Lifting Federation (Всероссийская федерация гиревого спорта) is a member of the International Union of Kettlebell Lifting (IUKL). A third International organisation exists, the International Girya Sport Federation (IGSF), founded in Lipetsk, Russia but currently based in Ukraine. In 2006, Valery Fedorenko, a former world champion from Kyrgyzstan founded the World Kettlebell Club in the United States (WKC). In 2012, The American Kettlebell Alliance (AKA) as founded to further develop and popularize kettlebell sport in the Americas.

International Kettlebell Lifting Union (IUKL) is leading organisation that is recoganised by AIMS – Alliance of Independent Recognized Members of Sports, also have Observer status from top multi sport organisation Global Association of International Sports Federations (GAISF).  

International Kettlebell Lifting Union (IUKL) is World Anti Doping Agency - WADA signatory. 

The International Kettlebell Marathon Federation (IKMF) is main organisation for marathon kettlebell lifting and also for Kettlebell Pentathlon. The IKMF hosts competitions using the traditional lifts in a marathon format (One arm—jerk, snatch, half snatch, long cycle. Two arm-jerk, long cycle, half snatch) for 30 minute and 60 minute sets. "Ultra-marathons" are 2+hours. Lifters can multi-switch arms for one bell lifts. If the bell/bells are set down before the time limit NONE of the reps count.

There are organizations, besides federations, which promote sport of kettlebell lifting, educate and license coaches and determine conditions for titles of mastery in sport of kettlebell lifting; more notable ones are: IKO KetAcademy, International Kettlebell and Fitness Federation, World Kettlebell Club, Girevoy Sport Union, International Kettlebell Sport & Fitness Academy.

World Association of Kettlebell Sport Clubs (WAKSC) is an association of sport clubs and organizations who practice kettlebell sport as their professional occupation. It also organizes World Championships (individual and team (club affiliation)).

World Championships

International Union of Kettlebell Lifting

IUKL World Championship 2022  
 http://www.giri-iukl.com/en/
 http://www.giri-iukl.com/en/competition-results/

World Association of Kettlebell Sport Clubs

 https://web.archive.org/web/20170424091938/http://waksc.com/

References

Strength athletics
Sports originating in Russia
Weightlifting